The first world record in the 100 metres freestyle in long course (50 metres) swimming was recognised by the International Swimming Federation (FINA) in 1905. In the short course (25 metres) swimming events,  the world's governing body recognizes world records since 3 March 1991.

Times have consistently dropped over the years due to better training techniques, new developments in the sport and swimwear changes (e.g. Goggles were not widely used until the 1970s, providing for considerable expansion of practice/training time.)

In the first four Olympics, competitions were not held in pools, but rather in open water (1896 – The Mediterranean Sea, 1900 – The Seine River, 1904 – an artificial lake, 1906 – The Mediterranean Sea). The 1904 Olympics freestyle race was the only one ever measured at 100 yards, instead of the usual 100 metres. A 100-metre pool was built for the 1908 Olympics and sat in the centre of the main stadium's track and field oval. The 1912 Olympics, held in the Stockholm harbour, marked the beginning of electronic timing.

Male swimmers wore full body suits up until the 1940s, which caused more drag in the water than their modern swim-wear counterparts. Also, over the years, pool designs have lessened the drag. Some design considerations allow for the reduction of swimming resistance making the pool faster. Namely, proper pool depth, elimination of currents, increased lane width, energy absorbing racing lane lines and gutters, and the use of other innovative hydraulic, acoustic and illumination designs.

In 2008, leading up to the Olympics, Speedo introduced a 50% Polyurethane suit dubbed LZR.  Pure polyurethane suits from Arena (X-Glide), Adidas (Hydrofoil) and Italian suit manufacturer, Jaked were thought to be largely responsible for the multiple World Records in 2009 including at the 2009 World Aquatics Championships (dubbed the "Plastic Games").  FINA announced a ban on non-textile suits that took effect in January 2010.

The 1924 Summer Olympics were the first to use the standard 50 metre pool with marked lanes. In the freestyle, swimmers originally dived from the pool walls, but diving blocks were eventually incorporated at the 1936 Summer Olympics. The tumble turn ("flip-turn") was developed by the 1950s.

Men

Long course

 #: Swim was never ratified by FINA as a world record, as Bernard wore an unapproved swimsuit.

Short course

Women

Long course

Short course

|-

All-time top 25

Men long course
Correct as of August 2022

Notes
Below is a list of other times equal or superior to 47.59:
David Popovici also swam 46.98 (2022), 47.07 (2022), 47.13 (2022, 2022), 47.20 (2022), 47.23 (2022), 47.30 (2021), 47.34 (2022), 47.37 (2022), 47.54 (2022), 47.56 (2021), 47.58 (2022).
Caeleb Dressel also swam 47.02 (2021), 47.17 (2017), 47.22 (2017), 47.23 (2021), 47.26 (2017, 2021), 47.32 (2019), 47.34 (2019), 47.35 (2019), 47.39 (2021).
Cesar Cielo also swam 47.09 (2009), 47.13 (2009), 47.29 (2009), 47.39 (2009), 47.48 (2009).
Alain Bernard also swam 47.12 (2009), 47.20 (2008), 47.21 (2008), 47.27 (2009), 47.50 (2008).
Eamon Sullivan also swam 47.24 (2008), 47.32 (2008), 47.52 (2008), 47.55 (2008).
Frederick Bousquet also swam 47.25 (2009).
Kliment Kolesnikov also swam 47.31 (2021), 47.37 (2021), 47.44 (2021), 47.53 (2021).
Kyle Chalmers also swam 47.35 (2019), 47.36 (2022), 47.37 (2019), 47.48 (2019), 47.51 (2022), 47.58 (2016, 2019), 47.59 (2021).
Ryan Held also swam 47.43 (2019).
Alessandro Miressi also swam 47.46 (2021), 47.52 (2021), 47.53 (2021).
James Magnussen also swam 47.49 (2011), 47.53 (2012, 2013), 47.59 (2014).
Stefan Nystrand also swam 47.52 (2009), 47.53 (2009).
Maxime Grousset also swam 47.54 (2022).
Brent Hayden also swam 47.56 (2008).
Cameron McEvoy also swam 47.56 (2016).
David Walters also swam 47.59 (2009).

Men short course
Correct as of December 2022

Notes
Below is a list of other times equal or superior to 45.78:
Kyle Chalmers also swam 45.03 (2021), 45.16 (2022), 45.50 (2021), 45.53 (2021), 45.54 (2018), 45.55 (2019, 2022), 45.65 (2021), 45.66 (2022), 45.69 (2021), 45.70 (2021), 45.73 (2021, 2021), 45.77 (2019), 45.78 (2018).
Amaury Leveaux also swam 45.12 (2008), 45.56 (2009), 45.76 (2008).
Vladimir Morozov also swam 45.16 (2018), 45.23 (2017), 45.30 (2018), 45.51 (2014), 45.52 (2012), 45.53 (2019), 45.56 (2017), 45.57 (2016), 45.64 (2013, 2018), 45.65 (2012, 2013, 2017), 45.66 (2018), 45.67 (2013), 45.68 (2012, 2013), 45.69 (2018), 45.74 (2013), 45.77 (2016).
Caeleb Dressel also swam 45.18 (2020), 45.20 (2020), 45.22 (2019), 45.47 (2021), 45.56 (2020), 45.62 (2018), 45.66 (2018), 45.69 (2019), 45.75 (2019).
Alessandro Miressi also swam 45.58 (2021), 45.74 (2022).
Maxime Grousset also swam 45.58 (2022), 45.61 (2022), 45.77 (2022).
Jordan Crooks also swam 45.61 (2022).
Danila Izotov also swam 45.70 (2009).
Stefan Nystrand also swam 45.73 (2009).
Brent Hayden also swam 45.75 (2009).
César Cielo also swam 45.75 (2014).
Ryan Held also swam 45.75 (2021).

Women long course
Correct as of June 2022

Notes
Below is a list of other times equal or superior to 52.99:
Cate Campbell also swam 52.06 (2016), 52.12 (2019), 52.33 (2013), 52.34 (2013, 2019), 52.35 (2019), 52.37 (2018, 2018), 52.38 (2016, 2016), 52.41 (2016), 52.43 (2019, 2021), 52.44 (2019), 52.51 (2019), 52.52 (2021), 52.59 (2021), 52.61 (2018, 2019), 52.62 (2014), 52.64 (2018, 2019), 52.68 (2014, 2014), 52.69 (2013, 2015, 2018), 52.70 (2014), 52.71 (2016, 2019, 2021), 52.72 (2014), 52.74 (2014), 52.76 (2019), 52.78 (2016, 2017, 2019, 2021), 52.80 (2021), 52.82 (2015), 52.83 (2013, 2021), 52.84 (2015, 2015), 52.85 (2016, 2021), 52.87 (2019, 2020), 52.89 (2013, 2014), 52.92 (2013), 52.96 (2015, 2019), 52.97 (2016).
Sarah Sjöström also swam 52.08 (2017), 52.23 (2019), 52.28 (2017), 52.31 (2017), 52.43 (2019), 52.44 (2017), 52.46 (2019), 52.54 (2017), 52.60 (2017), 52.62 (2021), 52.67 (2014, 2018), 52.68 (2021), 52.70 (2015), 52.73 (2014), 52.76 (2019), 52.77 (2018, 2018), 52.78 (2015, 2016), 52.80 (2022), 52.82 (2016, 2019, 2021), 52.86 (2017), 52.87 (2013), 52.89 (2013), 52.91 (2021), 52.93 (2018), 52.95 (2021), 52.97 (2015, 2019), 52.99 (2016, 2018).
Emma McKeon also swam 52.13 (2021), 52.19 (2021), 52.29 (2021), 52.32 (2021), 52.35 (2021), 52.41 (2019), 52.46 (2020), 52.49 (2021), 52.59 (2021), 52.71 (2021), 52.75 (2019), 52.77 (2019), 52.80 (2016), 52.84 (2019), 52.94 (2022), 52.95 (2021), 52.98 (2016).
Britta Steffen also swam 52.22 (2009), 52.56 (2009), 52.85 (2009), 52.87 (2009).
Simone Manuel also swam 52.27 (2017), 52.54 (2018), 52.66 (2018), 52.69 (2017), 52.70 (2016).
Siobhan Haughey also swam 52.40 (2021), 52.70 (2021), 52.92 (2021).
Bronte Campbell also swam 52.52 (2015), 52.58 (2016), 52.78 (2016), 52.84 (2019), 52.85 (2017, 2019), 52.86 (2014), 52.96 (2018), 52.98 (2015).
Mollie O'Callaghan also swam 52.63 (2022), 52.67 (2022), 52.70 (2022), 52.83 (2022), 52.85 (2022).
Penny Oleksiak also swam 52.70 (2016), 52.72 (2016), 52.86 (2021), 52.89 (2021), 52.94 (2017), 52.95 (2021), 52.98 (2022).
Pernille Blume also swam 52.72 (2018), 52.83 (2018), 52.96 (2021), 52.97 (2018), 52.99 (2017).
Mallory Comerford also swam 52.77 (2017), 52.81 (2017), 52.85 (2017), 52.94 (2018), 52.98 (2019).
Ranomi Kromowidjojo also swam 52.78 (2017).
Femke Heemskerk also swam 52.79 (2015, 2021), 52.93 (2021).
Anna Hopkin also swam 52.83 (2021).
Libby Trickett also swam 52.84 (2009), 52.88 (2008), 52.93 (2009), 52.95 (2009), 52.99 (2009).
Taylor Ruck also swam 52.85 (2018), 52.96 (2017).
Shayna Jack also swam 52.88 (2022).
Torri Huske also swam 52.96 (2022).
Madison Wilson also swam 52.99 (2022).

Women short course
Correct as of December 2022

Notes
Below is a list of other times equal or superior to 51.65:
Sarah Sjöström also swam 50.77 (2017), 50.99 (2017), 51.02 (2017), 51.03 (2017), 51.13 (2018), 51.17 (2020), 51.21 (2018), 51.22 (2018), 51.25 (2017), 51.26 (2021, 2021), 51.31 (2021), 51.32 (2014, 2020), 51.34 (2021), 51.37 (2015), 51.39 (2014), 51.42 (2018), 51.44 (2015), 51.45 (2021), 51.46 (2014), 51.50 (2019, 2019), 51.52 (2021), 51.53 (2021), 51.55 (2021), 51.56 (2018), 51.62 (2017), 51.64 (2020), 51.65 (2021).
Emma Mckeon also swam 50.67 (2021), 50.77 (2022), 50.96 (2021), 51.02 (2019), 51.03 (2022), 51.05 (2021), 51.15 (2021), 51.17 (2020), 51.27 (2019), 51.28 (2021, 2022), 51.36 (2021), 51.38 (2019), 51.47 (2021, 2021), 51.51 (2021), 51.58 (2021), 51.61 (2021).
Cate Campbell also swam 50.85 (2017), 50.91 (2015), 51.02 (2019), 51.20 (2019), 51.31 (2013), 51.37 (2019), 51.38 (2015), 51.45 (2017), 51.59 (2013, 2017).
Siobhan Haughey also swam 50.87 (2022), 50.94 (2020), 50.98 (2021), 51.00 (2022), 51.06 (2021), 51.11 (2021), 51.12 (2020), 51.13 (2021), 51.14 (2020), 51.18 (2021), 51.22 (2021), 51.30 (2020), 51.32 (2021), 51.35 (2020), 51.37 (2021), 51.38 (2020), 51.40 (2020), 51.42 (2021), 51.46 (2021), 51.48 (2021), 51.49 (2020), 51.59 (2020), 51.64 (2021), 51.65 (2021).
Ranomi Kromowidjojo also swam 51.01 (2018), 51.14 (2018), 51.14 (2017, 2018), 51.19 (2017), 51.26 (2018), 51.28 (2013), 51.29 (2018), 51.39 (2015), 51.42 (2018), 51.44 (2010), 51.44 (2009, 2010), 51.45 (2010), 51.47 (2014), 51.51 (2018), 51.51 (2014), 51.54 (2009,2013), 51.56 (2018), 51.57 (2014), 51.59 (2015), 51.60 (2017), 51.65 (2017).
Beryl Gastaldello also swam 51.16 (2020), 51.30 (2020), 51.38 (2020, 2020), 51.57 (2020).
Femke Heemskerk also swam 51.37 (2014), 51.38 (2018), 51.51 (2014), 51.58 (2020), 51.60 (2018), 51.62 (2014).
Abbey Weitzeil also swam 51.42 (2020), 51.62 (2021), 51.63 (2022), 51.64 (2021).
Freya Anderson also swam 51.49 (2019), 51.52 (2020).
Katarzyna Wasick also swam 51.44 (2021), 51.58 (2021).
Fran Halsall also swam 51.19 (2009), 51.61 (2009).
Marie Wattel also swam 51.45 (2019).
Kayla Sanchez also swam 51.45 (2018).
Madison Wilson also swam 51.54 (2022).

References

Freestyle 0100 metres
World record progression 0100 metres freestyle